Vincent James Capra (born July 7, 1996) is an American professional baseball infielder in the Toronto Blue Jays organization. He made his MLB debut in 2022 for Toronto.

Amateur career
Capra attended the Melbourne Central Catholic High School in Melbourne, Florida, where he helped lead the Hustlers to a state championship. He began playing college baseball at Eastern Florida State College. He transferred to the University of Richmond to play for the Richmond Spiders. In 2017, Capra batted .356 with four home runs and 19 runs batted in (RBIs) for the Spiders. He then appeared in 48 games for the Walla Walla Sweets of the West Coast League, a collegiate summer league. In his final season with the Spiders in 2018, Capra hit .327 with five home runs, 41 RBIs, and nine stolen bases.

Professional career
The Toronto Blue Jays selected Capra in the 20th round of the 2018 Major League Baseball draft. He was assigned to the Short Season-A Vancouver Canadians, and was later promoted to the Class-A Lansing Lugnuts. In a combined 64 games, Capra batted .248 with two home runs, 22 RBIs, and nine stolen bases. He spent the entire 2019 season with the Double-A New Hampshire Fisher Cats, and recorded a .229 batting average with three home runs, 33 RBIs, and 15 stolen bases. Capra did not play professional baseball at any level in 2020, due to the COVID-19 pandemic's cancellation of the minor league season. In 2021, he appeared in 79 games for the Fisher Cats and Triple-A Buffalo Bisons, and set new career-highs with a .316 batting average, 10 home runs, and 58 RBIs.

The Blue Jays promoted Capra to the major leagues on April 29, 2022. He made his major league debut on May 1. He appeared in 8 major league games for Toronto, going 1-for-5 with 2 walks. Capra hit .283/.378/.403 with 5 home runs and 28 RBI in 52 games with Triple-A Buffalo but missed the latter part of the year after undergoing left middle finger tendon surgery. On November 18, 2022, Capra was non tendered by the Blue Jays and became a free agent.

Capra re-signed with Toronto on a minor league contract on November 20, 2022.

References

External links

Living people
1996 births
Baseball players from Florida
People from Melbourne, Florida
Major League Baseball infielders
Major League Baseball outfielders
Toronto Blue Jays players
Richmond Spiders baseball players
Walla Walla Sweets players
Vancouver Canadians players
Lansing Lugnuts players
New Hampshire Fisher Cats players
Buffalo Bisons (minor league) players
American expatriate baseball players in Canada
Eastern Florida State College people